North Wind (Spanish: Viento norte) is a 1937 Argentine film directed by Mario Soffici.

In a survey of the 100 greatest films of Argentine cinema carried out by the Museo del Cine Pablo Ducrós Hicken in 2000, the film reached the 39th position.

Cast
Camila Quiroga		
Enrique Muiño		
Elías Alippi		
Ángel Magaña

References

External links

1937 films
1930s Spanish-language films
Argentine black-and-white films
Films directed by Mario Soffici
Argentine Western (genre) films
1937 Western (genre) films
1930s Argentine films